Wakaba Tomita (born 9 April 1997) is a Japanese judoka.

She won a silver medal at the 2021 World Judo Championships.

She won the gold medal in her event at the 2022 Judo Grand Slam Paris held in Paris, France.

References

External links
 
 
 

1997 births
Living people
Japanese female judoka
20th-century Japanese women
21st-century Japanese women